Marvin Rotblatt (October 18, 1927 – July 16, 2013), nicknamed "Rotty", was a left-handed pitcher in Major League Baseball for the Chicago White Sox in the ,  and  seasons. His ERAs in 1948 (7.85) and 1950 (6.23) were the highest in the majors. He failed to get a base hit in fifteen career at-bats.

Biography
Rotblatt was born in Chicago, where his father, a Jewish immigrant from Poland, owned a lamp business. He was Jewish.

He attended Von Steuben High School in Chicago. Before playing professional baseball, Rotblatt played for the University of Illinois at Urbana-Champaign. The 1947-48 team won the Big Nine Championship.

His minor league Southern Association record included a season-high 202 strikeouts and a no-hitter.

As a result, in 1951 he appeared on You Bet Your Life, the television quiz show hosted by Groucho Marx, after being selected at an audition over his pitching teammate Bob Cain, who knew something about short players. While pitching for the 1951 Detroit Tigers, Cain walked Eddie Gaedel, a  pinch hitter signed by St. Louis Browns owner Bill Veeck, also a showman who enjoyed staging publicity stunts.

In 1964, students at Carleton College in Northfield, Minnesota named an intramural slow-pitch softball league after Rotblatt. Although traditional intramural softball is still played at Carleton, the name Rotblatt now refers to an annual beer softball game that is played with one inning for every year of the school's over 150-year existence.

References

External links

1927 births
2013 deaths
American expatriate baseball players in Mexico
American people of Polish-Jewish descent
Atlanta Crackers players
Baseball players from Chicago
Charleston Senators players
Chicago White Sox players
Jewish American baseball players
Jewish Major League Baseball players
Little Rock Travelers players
Louisville Colonels (minor league) players
Major League Baseball pitchers
Memphis Chickasaws players
Mexican League baseball pitchers
Montgomery Rebels players
Sacramento Solons players
Sultanes de Monterrey players
Syracuse Chiefs players
Topeka Hawks players
Tulsa Oilers (baseball) players
Waterloo White Hawks players
21st-century American Jews